In the geometry of complex algebraic curves, a local parameter for a curve C at a smooth point P is a meromorphic function on C that has a simple zero at P. This concept can be generalized to curves defined over fields other than  (or schemes), because the local ring at a smooth point P of an algebraic curve C (defined over an algebraically closed field) is always a discrete valuation ring. This valuation will show a way to count the order (at the point P) of rational functions (which are natural generalizations for meromorphic functions in the non-complex realm) having a zero or a pole at P.

Local parameters, as its name indicates, are used mainly to properly count multiplicities in a local way.

Introduction
If C is a complex algebraic curve, count multiplicities of zeroes and poles of meromorphic functions defined on it. In this last case, say that the germ of the regular function  vanishes at  if . This is in complete analogy with the complex case, in which the maximal ideal of the local ring at a point P is actually conformed by the germs of holomorphic functions vanishing at P.

Hence, the idea of having a simple zero at a point P is now complete: it will be a rational function  such that its germ falls into , with d at most 1.

This has an algebraic resemblance with the concept of a uniformizing parameter (or just uniformizer) found in the context of discrete valuation rings in commutative algebra; a uniformizing parameter for the DVR (R, m) is just a generator of the maximal ideal m. The link comes from the fact that a local parameter at P will be a uniformizing parameter for the DVR, whence the name.

Definition
Let C be an algebraic curve defined over an algebraically closed field K, and let K(C) be the field of rational functions of C. The valuation on K(C) corresponding to a smooth point  is defined as
, where  is the usual valuation on the local ring. A local parameter for C at P is a function  such that .

References

Commutative algebra
Algebraic geometry